Ilya Alekseyevich Golyatov (born 6 April 2002) is a Russian football player. He plays for FC Dynamo Vologda on loan from FC KAMAZ Naberezhnye Chelny.

Club career
He made his debut in the Russian Football National League for FC Spartak-2 Moscow on 3 April 2021 in a game against FC Chayka Peschanokopskoye.

International career
He represented Russia at the 2019 UEFA European Under-17 Championship, he appeared in all three games Russia played at the tournament as it was eliminated at group stage.

References

External links
 Profile by Russian Football National League
 

2002 births
People from Zheleznogorsk, Kursk Oblast
Sportspeople from Kursk Oblast
Living people
Russian footballers
Russia youth international footballers
Association football forwards
FC Spartak-2 Moscow players
FC KAMAZ Naberezhnye Chelny players
FC Dynamo Vologda players
Russian First League players
Russian Second League players